Sedov (masculine) or Sedova (feminine) is a Russian surname. Notable people with the surname include:

Anastasia Sedova (born 1995), Russian cross-country skier
Georgy Sedov, Russian Arctic explorer
Lev Sedov, son of Leon Trotsky
Leonid I. Sedov, physicist and first chair of space programme
Natalia Sedova, the second wife of Leon Trotsky
Pavel Sedov, Russian ice hockey player
Sergei Sedov, another son of Leon Trotsky

Russian-language surnames